Mike Sullivan (born January 28, 1967) is an American football coach who is currently the quarterbacks coach for the Pittsburgh Steelers of the National Football League (NFL).  He was the wide receivers coach for the New York Giants from 2004 to 2009 and the quarterbacks coach from 2010 to 2011, and the offensive coordinator for the NFL's Tampa Bay Buccaneers from 2012 to 2013.

Early years
Sullivan grew up mostly in Southern California and graduated from Cabrillo H.S. in Lompoc, CA in 1985. He then attended the U.S. Military Academy in West Point, NY where he was a two-year letterman in football as a defensive back, and graduated in 1989. He was commissioned as an Infantry Officer upon graduation, later attending the Army Airborne, Ranger, and Air Assault Schools before serving in the 25th Infantry Division.

Coaching career

New York Giants (2004–2011)

Quarterbacks coach (2004–2011)
Sullivan served as the Giants' Quarterbacks coach where his coaching was cited as a major reason for Eli Manning's success in his early seasons. He was the main reason for Eli Manning's historic 2010 season. Manning set franchise records with 339 completions and a 62.9 completion percentage, as well as his second season with over 4,000 yards, but also threw a then career-high 25 interceptions.

He remained on the staff as the quarterbacks coach in 2011, coaching Eli Manning to perhaps his greatest statistical season. Manning threw for a career-high 4,933 yards, 29 touchdowns with 16 interceptions, and had a completion percentage of over 60% for the fourth year in a row with Mike Sullivan as his position coach. The Giants would go on to win Super Bowl XLVI against the New England Patriots 21-17, with Eli Manning being named Super Bowl MVP under Sullivan's coaching.

Tampa Bay Buccaneers (2012–2014)
On February 10, 2012, Sullivan was hired as the Tampa Bay Buccaneers' offensive coordinator. On December 31, 2012, NFL.com reported that Sullivan will be interviewed by the Chicago Bears for the head coaching position after Lovie Smith was fired. On December 30, 2013, Sullivan was fired along with the rest of the Tampa Bay Buccaneers staff after two unsuccessful seasons.

Return to the Giants (2015–17)

Quarterbacks coach (2015)
On December 31, 2014, Sullivan was re-hired as the Giants quarterback coach, reuniting with his former team and quarterback, Eli Manning. Sullivan replaced Danny Langsdorf, who left to take the offensive coordinator job at Nebraska.

Offensive Coordinator (2016–17)
On January 14, 2016, Sullivan was promoted to offensive coordinator with the departure of former Giants head coach Tom Coughlin, and the hiring of former offensive coordinator Ben McAdoo.

Denver Broncos (2018)
On January 4, 2018, Sullivan was named as the quarterbacks coach of the Denver Broncos, taking over for interim QB coach Klint Kubiak. Following the end of the Broncos season, he was not retained by newly-hired head coach Vic Fangio.

Pittsburgh Steelers (2021-present)
On February 4, 2021, Sullivan was hired by the Steelers as quarterbacks coach.

Administrative career
On March 19, 2020, Sullivan returned to West Point as the football team's Director of Recruiting.

Personal life
Sullivan is a purple belt in Brazilian Jiu Jitsu. He also graduated from U.S. Army Ranger School. He is a 1989 graduate of the United States Military Academy and classmate of Gregory D. Gadson.

References

External links
 Denver Broncos bio

1967 births
Living people
American football defensive backs
Army Black Knights football coaches
Army Black Knights football players
Humboldt State Lumberjacks football coaches
California State Polytechnic University, Humboldt alumni
Jacksonville Jaguars coaches
National Football League offensive coordinators
New York Giants coaches
Ohio Bobcats football coaches
People from Totowa, New Jersey
Sportspeople from Santa Maria, California
Tampa Bay Buccaneers coaches
United States Military Academy alumni
Youngstown State Penguins football coaches
Military personnel from California
Military personnel from New Jersey
Pittsburgh Steelers coaches